Nawaf Al-Qumairi (born 10 June 2001) is a Saudi Arabian professional footballer who plays as a right-back for Saudi Pro League side Al-Tai.

Club career
Al-Qumairi started his career at the youth teams of Al-Shabab. On 9 November 2020, Al-Qumairi was chosen to be part of the scholarship program to develop football talents established by the General Sports Authority in Saudi Arabia. On 27 June 2022, Al-Qumairi joined Pro League side Al-Tai on a two-year contract. He made his debut on 26 August 2022 in the 2–1 win against Al-Ettifaq. In his first month at the club, Al-Qumairi made 4 appearances and assisted twice. For his impressive performances, Al-Qumairi was awarded the Young Player of the Month award.

International career
Al-Qumairi earned his first call-up for the Saudi Arabia U23 national team during the 2021 Islamic Solidarity Games. He made 2 appearances throughout the competition as the Green Falcons finished in second place, earning a silver medal.

References

External links
 

2001 births
Living people
Association football fullbacks
Saudi Arabian footballers
Saudi Arabia youth international footballers
Al-Shabab FC (Riyadh) players
Al-Tai FC players
Saudi Professional League players